Anduhjerd (also known as Andūhjerd and Andigird) is a city in Shahdad District, Kerman County, Kerman Province, Iran.  At the 2006 census, its population was 2,853, in 703 families.

References

Populated places in Kerman County

Cities in Kerman Province